Alice Echols is Professor of History, and the Barbra Streisand Chair of Contemporary Gender Studies at the University of Southern California.

Education
Echols received her bachelor's degree from Macalester College, Minnesota in 1973. She obtained her master's degree and Doctorate at the University of Michigan in 1980 and 1986 respectively.

Career
While in graduate school at the University of Michigan, Echols visited the Rubaiyat, a since-closed predominantly gay bar where the "music just stunk." After persuasion from friends, she got a trial gig and then was hired, beginning her career as a Disco DJ.

She was a visiting associate professor at Rutgers University starting in spring 2007.

Echols began her career as The Barbra Streisand Professor in Contemporary Gender Studies and Professor of English and History at the University of Southern California on August 15, 2011.

Honors and awards

Publications
She authored Daring to Be Bad: Radical Feminism in America 1967-1975 (with foreword by Ellen Willis); Scars of Sweet Paradise: The Life and Times of Janis Joplin; Shaky Ground: The Sixties and Its Aftershocks; and Hot Stuff: Disco and the Remaking of American Culture. Her book Shortfall: Family Secrets, Financial Collapse, and a Hidden History of American Banking was published by The New Press on October 3, 2017.

She also wrote a chapter on the Women's Liberation Movement in William McConnell's book The Counterculture Movement of the 1960s.

Echols was also interviewed in the 2012 documentary, The Secret Disco Revolution, where she emphasized the political nature of disco and its role in Black, queer, and women's liberation.

Selected bibliography
Daring to Be Bad: Radical Feminism in America 1967-1975 (with foreword by Ellen Willis)
Shaky Ground: The Sixties and its Aftershocks (2002)
Scars of Sweet Paradise: The Life and Times of Janis Joplin (1999)
Hot Stuff: Disco and the Remaking of American Culture (2009)

References

External links

Year of birth missing (living people)
Living people
21st-century American historians
Historians of the United States
University of Southern California faculty
Macalester College alumni
University of Michigan alumni
American women historians
21st-century American women writers
Historians from California